Sir John Talbot's  is a mixed secondary school in Whitchurch, Shropshire, England, for pupils aged between 11 and 18. The most recent inspection report was in April 2017 and resulted in a judgement of good in all five aspects of the inspection  In September 2014 the school reopened as an academy as part of The Marches Academy Trust with a new head teacher Mr David John O'Toole. Mr Tim Stonall was appointed headteacher in May 2020

Extracurricular activities
Sir John Talbot's offers different extracurricular activities for the students such as Computer Club, Homework Club, Vex Club (STEM), Performing Arts Club and Sports Club. The school also participates in the Duke of Edinburgh's Award Scheme.

Location
The school is located in the small market town Whitchurch in North Shropshire. The catchment area is Whitchurch itself and the surrounding villages. The school sits in mature grounds with historic roots providing an attractive setting in which students work. Facilities are extensive including the community leisure centre and well-resourced faculty areas and sixth form center.

Notable pupils
Stuart Mason - professional footballer

Leisure centre
Whitchurch Leisure Centre, available for community use, is located at the Sir John Talbot School on the edge of town. It offers a range of exercise facilities and classes.

References

Secondary schools in Shropshire
Academies in Shropshire
Whitchurch, Shropshire